The Registrar of the Baronetage is responsible for maintaining and updating the Official Roll of the Baronetage.

History

List of Registrars

References 

Crown Office
English law
Ministry of Justice (United Kingdom)
Civil Service (United Kingdom)
Peerages in the United Kingdom
Baronetcies